This is a list of episodes for the television series The F.B.I., which aired from 1965 to 1974. All episodes were filmed in color.

Series overview

Episodes

Season 1 (1965–66)

Season 2 (1966–67)

Season 3 (1967–68)

Season 4 (1968–69)

Season 5 (1969–70)

Season 6 (1970–71)

Season 7 (1971–72)

Season 8 (1972–73)

Season 9 (1973–74)

References

External links
 
 

F.B.I.